The Waterville Bridge is a lenticular truss bridge designed and manufactured by the Berlin Iron Bridge Co.  It was built in 1890.

It was relocated from Waterville, Lycoming County, Pennsylvania, to Swatara State Park in Lebanon County, Pennsylvania, in 1985.

It was listed on the National Register of Historic Places in 1988.

See also
List of bridges documented by the Historic American Engineering Record in Pennsylvania

References

Road bridges on the National Register of Historic Places in Pennsylvania
1890s architecture in the United States
Pedestrian bridges in Pennsylvania
Transportation buildings and structures in Lebanon County, Pennsylvania
Appalachian Trail
Historic American Engineering Record in Pennsylvania
Relocated buildings and structures in Pennsylvania
National Register of Historic Places in Lebanon County, Pennsylvania
Former road bridges in the United States
Lenticular truss bridges in the United States